Ollie! The Boy Who Became What He Ate (sometimes stylized Ollie the Boy Who Became What He Ate or Ollie! or Ollie) is an animated children's television series by Radical Sheep. Each segment is 11 minutes, aired every morning; except for Sunday. It debuted on CBC Kids, Canada on February 18, 2017. The second season premiered on February 2, 2019. It is produced by Keyframe Animation Inc. who created Tee and Mo and Pinky Dinky Doo.

History
The animated kids series Ollie! The Boy Who Became What He Ate about Ollie, a hesitant eater who turns every meal into an adventure as he becomes what he eats, is based on the work of Sheena Macrae, who also was the executive producer of the series. Diana Moore was the executive story editor / writer.

In March 2014, it was announced that CBC Kids, Radical Sheep Productions and Mickey Rogers Media made a deal to produce an animated series. In December 2015, the Canadian Temple Street Distribution acquired rights for the upcoming TV series. Steve Krecklo, former member of The Carnations, composed the soundtrack for the new series. The series debuted on CBC Kids on February 18, 2017. Season 2 premiered on February 2, 2019.

In April 2019, the series was nominated for the Canada’s Youth Media Alliance (YMA) English-language Awards of Excellence for television and digital.

Broadcast
The series aired internationally on Universal Kids (US), Discovery (MENA), Discovery Asia,  Huashi TV (China), Bolivision (Bolivia), Azteca Uno (Mexico), Yle Teema (Finland), and Switzerland 4 (Switzerland). It was distributed online by Amazon Prime (excluding Canada) and CBC Gem in Canada. Currently it airs on Pink Super Kids in Serbia.

Characters
Ollie, a 6 year old boy who is a very picky eater, voiced by Gavin MacIver-Wright.
Poppy, Ollie's younger sister, voiced by Zoe Hatz.
Nummy, Poppy's stuffed rabbit, who speaks in squeaks and comes to life when Ollie and Poppy go on an adventure.
Leo, Ollie's best friend.
The Nummlings, little bunny-like creatures who speak in squeaks, like Nummy.

Episodes

Season 1

Season 2

References

External links
 Offiical website

2010s Canadian animated television series
2017 Canadian television series debuts
2019 Canadian television series endings
Canadian children's animated adventure television series
Canadian flash animated television series
Canadian preschool education television series
English-language television shows
Animated television series about children
Animated television series about rabbits and hares
Animated preschool education television series
2010s preschool education television series
Television series by Radical Sheep Productions
CBC Kids original programming